Ghamand ( Pride) is a  Pakistani Urdu-language drama serial that began airing on A-Plus TV from 29 June 2018. The series was produced by Sadia Jabbar under their banner Sadia Jabbar Productions.

Noman Ijaz and Sunita Marshall played the lead roles with Minal Khan in a supporting role. It is adapted from Saira Raza's novel "Mustarad".

Cast 
Noman Ijaz as Maqsood
Sunita Marshall as Shahina 
Minal Khan as Hani 
Sadaf Aashan as Rashida
Mahjabeen Habib as Shehnaz
Munawar Saeed as Seth Sajawal
Aiza Awan as Chandni
Swaleh Qayyum as Haroon
Afshan Qureshi as Mumtaz
Saman Ansari as Zamarud
Farooq Jawaid as Aizaz
Benazir Khan as Azra

Production 
The serial was directed by Asim Ali, known for Mere Qatil Mere Dildar, and was produced by Sadia Jabbar Productions who previously produced the acclaimed film Balu Mahi in 2017. The drama features Noman Ijaz and Sunita Marshall in the lead. Both the actors had shared the screen for the first time after 8 years as they were last seen in Mera Saaein in 2010. Saman Ansari was also in the supporting role. She is famous for her role in the 2017 series Sammi and played the role of "Sitara Shah" in the blockbuster drama serial Khaani.

References

External links 
 

Pakistani drama television series
Urdu-language television shows
2018 Pakistani television series debuts
A-Plus TV original programming